Fredrick Arthur Willius (November 24, 1888 – October 19, 1972) was an American research cardiologist and medical historian who was the founding director of the Cardiology section at the Mayo Clinic.

Life

Early life and education
Fredrick Arthur Willius was born in St. Paul, Minnesota, to Gustav Otto Conrad Willius (November 25, 1831 – September 26, 1924) and his wife Emma (née Klausmeyer, August 30, 1855 – April 26, 1933). Gustav Willius and his brother, Ferdinand, were German immigrants who settled in St. Paul and established themselves in banking and finance. Emma Klausmeyer's father was Wilhelm Klausmeyer, himself an immigrant from Bavaria, who was a choir director, a pianist, and a member of the board of directors of the Cincinnati Conservatory of Music. Fredrick’s maternal uncle Alfred Klausmeyer was the founder of the Anchor Buggy company, an early American manufacturer of automobiles. Fredrick's early education took place in the public schools of Dayton's Bluff, where he was born and raised. In 1906, shortly after beginning his third year at Mechanic Arts High School, Willius was struck with an attack of acute appendicitis, but when the first operation proved unsuccessful and complications set in, he was operated on by Dr. Arnold Schwyzer on the family's kitchen table, and after a period of convalescence, he was returned to health. Willius credited this experience with inspiring him to pursue medicine, which went firmly against his father's wishes that he study architecture. Despite his father's reluctance, Fredrick graduated from high school with honors, at which point he enrolled in the University of Minnesota, with the intention to study medicine. He graduated from the university in 1912 as a Bachelor of Science, and in 1914 as a Doctor of Medicine. He was a member of Phi Rho Sigma Medical Society, as well as the Sigma Xi Scientific Research Honor Society. During his third year at the University of Minnesota, he participated in research with James F. Corbett on the causes and pathology of diabetes mellitus, for which he was awarded the Rollin E. Cutts Medal for experimental surgery. After graduation, Willius entered into a twelve-month internship at the University Hospital, and in 1915, he began his three-year fellowship in surgery at the Mayo Clinic in Rochester, Minnesota.

Marriage and family
On September 26, 1917, Willius married Stella Mae (née Popple, March 14, 1891 – June 22, 1986), the daughter of Herbert Eugene Popple (January 1858 - October 15, 1935) and Jennie Johnson (née , November 14, 1856 – May 27, 1952). Stella was born and raised on her parents' farm in Stewartville, Minnesota, and moved to Rochester in 1916. Stella's elder sister Corena had married Dr. William Plummer, the brother of Willius' mentor Henry Plummer in 1911, and this connection helped Stella find work at the Mayo clinic, as a technician in the pathology laboratory. It was while working at Mayo that the young couple became acquainted, and they were married shortly after. Their marriage produced three daughters.
Jane Eleanor (September 8, 1918 – May 18, 2002) married Rudolph Matas Landry, the grandson and namesake of Dr. Rudolph Matas.
Mary Elizabeth (August 6, 1920 – December 11, 2015)
Dorothy Corinne (November 19, 1925 -)

Medical career

Willius' arrival in Rochester in 1915 coincided with the inauguration of the Mayo Foundation for Medical Education and Research, a collaboration between the Mayo Clinic and the University of Minnesota, which enabled him to receive his Master of Science in Medicine through study and work at the clinic, rather than having to return to the medical school in Minneapolis. Entering into his fellowship, Willius was assigned to work with Henry Stanley Plummer, one of the most respected diagnosticians in the country, and it was in working with Plummer that Fredrick realized his interest lay in internal medicine and not surgery, which led to a change of specialty.

Plummer and his colleague John M. Blackford had, in 1915, installed at the Mayo Clinic one of the first ECG machines in the country, only five years after Alfred Cohn's successful adoption of the technology at Mount Sinai Hospital in New York City. The following year, Willius was appointed first assistant in Medicine, and assigned to work with Blackford and Plummer in the newly established ECG lab. In 1917, he published his first paper with Blackford, on chronic heart-block, which helped establish his credentials as an expert in the field of echocardiography. Later that year, Blackford left Mayo to help start the Virginia Mason Medical Center in Seattle, Washington, at which point Willius was promoted to head of the lab. By 1920, Willius had received his Master of Science in Medicine, and been promoted to Associate in medicine, where his passion for cardiology and diseases of the heart had become apparent. Cardiology was still in its early years as a medical specialty, particularly in the United States, so other doctors throughout the Clinic often asked Willius to consult on their cases involving heart conditions.

In 1922, Willius was asked by Plummer, Will Mayo, and Charles Mayo to organize a new section at the Mayo Clinic: cardiology. Willius would remain chief of the cardiology section until his retirement in 1945, after which he remained a senior consultant for more than a decade. Given the youth of cardiology in this nation, much of the early work at the section revolved around creating standards with which to evaluate patients, both in terms of clinical practice, as well as collecting pertinent medical data to advance the field. During the first year alone, patients from sixteen states were admitted to the cardiology section. This indicated a serious need for specialized heart care, and so additional funding was staff were secured to increase the capacity. Like his mentor, Plummer, Willius took theory and practice very seriously as a clinician, and so laid out strict rules for how patients were to be seen in his section:

In addition to his clinical duties, Willius was made an instructor at the Mayo Graduate School of Medicine (now the Mayo Clinic College of Medicine and Science) in 1920. In 1922, he was promoted to assistant professor, in 1927 to associate professor, and in 1945, upon his retirement from practice, to full professor. While focusing on his clinical and educational roles, Willius also actively engaged in cardiological research, including continuing his research into the use and effectiveness of EKG technology. As his career advanced, he also developed an interest in the formation and pathology of thromboses, the therapeutic use of digitalis, and the effect of syphilis on the human heart. In 1938, Willius and his colleagues John English and Joseph Berkson were among the first clinicians to accurately predict a direct link between tobacco smoking and heart disease, and this research later contributed to reversing decades of false information about the dangers of smoking.

His retirement meant that he could focus on another of his great loves: the history of medicine. In 1941, Willius and Thomas Keys published Cardiac Classics. A Collection of Classic Works on the Heart and Circulation, with Comprehensive Biographic Accounts of the Authors, an exploration of the history of the heart as it pertained to medicine. From William Harvey to James B. Herrick, the book reproduced work by fifty-one scholars, scientists, and doctors who contributed to our understanding of the hear and its workings, and who helped make modern cardiology what it is. In addition, the lives of the selected authors are outlined in detail, further explaining the context of their discoveries and their meaning to scholars today. In 1949, along with his writing partner Thomas J. Dry, Willius wrote A History of the Heart and the Circulation. At once a historical and a medical text, the book explores the intersection between the heart, blood, and medical knowledge, spanning the centuries from ancient times to the present. While of a similar vein to Willius's first volume, this adopts more holistic approach to the study of history, and focuses on exploring and analyzing the trajectory of the science of medicine as a whole, rather than reproducing  the works of previous scholars.

Willius was elected president of the Minnesota chapter of the American Heart Association in 1925. His lifelong organizational ties also included the American Medical Association, the Minnesota Medical Association, the Olmsted-Fillmore-Houston-Dodge Counties Medical Society, the Southern Minnesota Medical Association, the American College of Physicians, the American College of Surgeons, the Minnesota Society for the Study of the Heart and Circulation (President 1925 and 1941), the Central Society for Clinical Research (Charter member), the Central Interurban Clinical Club, the Minnesota Society of Internal Medicine, and the Alumni Association of the Mayo Foundation.

In 1957, Willius was invited by the Royal College of Surgeons to give a speech on the legacy and contributions of William Harvey to his field of cardiology, and medicine as a whole. Due to ill health, he was unable to attend the conference, but his speech was delivered in his stead by his friend and colleague Thomas Forrest Cotton.

A lifelong smoker, Willius suffered from emphysema for much of his later life, but it was ultimately an unexpected diagnosis of bladder cancer that took his life on October 19, 1972. In honor of "his appreciation of medical history and the great physicians of ages past, as well as for his dedication to those who would come after him", the Willius Society: A History of Medicine Organization for Mayo Clinic Residents and Fellows, was named after him.

Books published

Willius, Fredrick A. Clinical Electrocardiography. Philadelphia; London: W.B. Saunders, 1922.
---. Clinical Electrocardiograms: Their Interpretation and Significance. Philadelphia; London: W.B. Saunders, 1929.
---. Cardiac Clinics: A Mayo Clinic Monograph. St. Louis: C.V. Mosby, 1941.
Willius, Fredrick A., and Thomas E. Keys. Cardiac Classics: A Collection of Classic Works on the Heart and Circulation, with Comprehensive Biographic Accounts of the Authors. London: H. Kimpton, 1941.
Willius, Fredrick A., and Thomas J. Dry. A History of the Heart and the Circulation. Philadelphia: W.B. Saunders, 1948.
Willius, Fredrick A. Aphorisms of Dr. Charles Horace Mayo, 1865–1939, and Dr. William James Mayo, 1861-1939. Rochester, Minn.: Whiting Press, 1951.
---. Henry Stanley Plummer: A Diversified Genius. Springfield, Ill.: Charles C. Thomas, 1960.

Articles published
As sole author:
Arborization Block. Arch Intern Med (Chic). 1919;23(4):431–440.
Congenital Dextrocardia. Am J Med Sci. 1919;157(4):485-492.
Myocardial Disease With Reference to the Subendocardial Myocardium. Med. Clin. North Am. 1919;3:653-665.
Chronic Bradycardia. Arch Intern Med (Chic). 1920;26(5):630–646.
Observations on Negativity of the Final Ventricular T-Wave of the Electrocardiogram. Am J Med Sci. 1920;160(6):844-864.
Observations on Changes in Form of the Initial Ventricular Complex in Isolated Derivations of the Human Electrocardiogram. Arch Intern Med (Chic). 1920;25(5):550–564.
Report of a Case of Congenital Heart Disease with Complete Auriculoventricular Dissociation Presenting Unusual Features. Boston Med Surg J. 1921; 184:64-66
Angina Pectoris: An Electrocardiographic Study. Arch Intern Med (Chic). 1921;27(2):192–223.
Atypical Pain with Angina Pectoris. Med Clin N Amer. 1921;V:371–393.
Electrocardiography and Prognosis: I. Significant T-Wave Negativity in Isolated and Combined Derivations of the Electrocardiogram. Arch Intern Med (Chic). 1922;30(4):434-450.
Angina Pectoris and Surgical Conditions of the Abdomen. Ann Surg. 1924;79(4)
Thyroid Preparations in the Treatment of the Stokes-Adams' Syndrome. Can Med Assoc J. 1924;14(11):1072-6. 
The progress of cardiology during 1924: A review of the works of clinicians and investigators in the United States. Minnesota Med 1925;8:165-170, 230-236, 293-297.
The Heart in Prostatic Hypertrophy. Jour. Urol. 1925;xiii: 337-342.
A plan for the organization of preventive cardiology in Minnesota. Collected Papers of the Mayo Clinic 1925;17:1020-1024
Prognosis in Heart Disease. Illinois Medical Journal. 1925;xlviii: 55-61.
New Methods in the Treatment of Diseases of the Heart. Northwest Medicine. 1926;xxv:248-355
Cardiology in the Mayo Clinic and the Mayo Foundation for Medical Education and Research. Methods and Problems of Medical Education (Eighth series), p 193-197. New York: Rockefeller Foundation, 1927.
Clinical and Pathologic Data in Cases Exhibiting T-Wave Negativity in the Electrocardiograms. Am J Med Sci. 1928;175(5):630-638.
A Study of the Course of Syphilitic Cardiovascular Disease. American Heart Journal. 1930;6(1):113-115.
Congenital Dextrocardia with Situs Transversus Complicated by Hypertensive Heart Disease; Electrocardiographic Changes. American Heart Journal. 1931;7(1):110-113.
Occurrence and Significance of Electrocardiograms Displaying Large Q-Waves in Lead III. American Heart Journal. 1931;6(6):723-729.
The Heart in Old Age: A Study of 700 Patients Seventy-Five Years or Older. Am J Med Sci. 1931;182(1)
Newer Concepts of Cardiovascular Syphilis. J Tennessee M A 1934;27:494. 
Clinic On Syphilitic Aortitis and Aortitic Insufficiency With Anginal Syndromes. Proc Staff Meet Mayo Clin. 1936;11:692.
Life Expectancy in Coronary Thrombosis. JAMA. 1936;106(22):1890–1894.
Digitalis: Its Rational Use. Med. Clin. North Am. 1937;21(3)
The Management and Treatment of the Heart in Senescence. Med. Clin. North Am. 1937;21(3):755-760.
The Treatment of a Failing Heart. Med. Clin. North Am. 1938;22(4):1137-1146
Some Cardiac Emergencies. Med. Clin. North Am. 1938;22(4):895-906.
A Comprehensive Approach to the Diagnosis of Diseases of the Heart. Med. Clin. North Am. 1939;23(4):1007-1019.
Coronary disease and life insurance Abstract of the Proceedings of the Association of Life Insurance Medical Directors of America. 1939;26:215-36.
Adjustment to the Advancing Years of Life. Med. Clin. North Am. 1940;24(4):1271-1275.
Cardiac Clinics. XCI. Recreational Exercise in the Advancing Years of Life. Proc Staff Meet Mayo Clin. 1942;17(6) 
The Controversial Issue of the Use of Digitalis in Coronary Arterial Disease. Med. Clin. North Am. 1944;28(4):905-910.
Cor Pulmonale. Can Med Assoc J. 1946;54(1):42–46.
Digitalis Intoxication. J Ark Med Soc. 1946 Apr;42:219.
The necessity and importance of adoption of sedentary hobbies. Proc Staff Meet Mayo Clin. 1948;23(18):412.
Certain factors influencing survival and death in coronary artery disease. Minn Med. 1948;31(5):497-503.
The origin and evolution of diagnostic procedures with reference to diseases of the heart and circulation: I. the pulse. Proc Staff Meet Mayo Clin. 1949;24(13):350-4. 
The origin and evolution of diagnostic procedures with reference to diseases of the heart and circulation: II. physical diagnosis. Proc Staff Meet Mayo Clin. 1949;24(16):424-7.
The origin and evolution of diagnostic procedures with reference to diseases of the heart and circulation: III. measurement of blood pressure. Proc Staff Meet Mayo Clin. 1949;24(23):576-80. 
The origin and evolution of diagnostic procedures with reference to diseases of the heart and circulation. V. electrical registration of the activity of the heart. Proc Staff Meet Mayo Clin. 1950;25(13):374-6
The origin and evolution of diagnostic procedures with reference to diseases of the heart and circulation: VI. roentgenography of the heart and great vessels. Proc Staff Meet Mayo Clin. 1950;25(18):514-7.
The origin and evolution of diagnostic procedures with reference to diseases of the heart and circulation: VII. miscellaneous procedures. Proc Staff Meet Mayo Clin. 1950;25(24):660-4.
In collaboration:
Blackford, J.M. and F.A. Willius. Chronic heart-block. Am J Med Sci 1917;154:585-592
Blackford, J.M., F.A. Willius and S.B. Haines. Operative Risk in Cardiac Disease. JAMA. 1917;LXIX(24):2011–2014.
Blackford, J.M. and F.A. Willius. Auricular Flutter. Arch Intern Med (Chic). 1918;XXI(1):147–165. 
Willius, F. A. and W. M. Boothby. The Heart in Exophthalmic Goitre and Adenoma with Hyperthyroidism, Med Clin N Am. 1923;7:189.
Willius, F.A. and A.R. Barnes. Paroxysmal Tachycardia with Special Reference to Prognosis. Boston Med Surg J. 1924;191:666-670.
Haines, S.F. and F.A. Willius. Intermittent Ventricular Fibrillation with Complete Recovery: Report of a Case. Boston Med Surg J. 1925;193:473-475.
---. The status of the heart in myxedema. Am. Heart Jr., 1925; i: 67-72.
Amberg, S. and F.A. Willius. Auricular Flutter with Congenital Heart Disease. Am J Dis Child. 1926;32(1):99–104.
Willius, F.A. and W.A. Killins. The Occurrence and Significance of Electrocardiograms of Low Voltage. Arch Intern Med (Chic). 1927;40(3):332–339. 
Willius, F.A. and S. Amberg. Paroxysmal Tachycardia with Syncope Occurring in a Child. Am J Dis Child. 1929;38(3):551–558.
Allen, E.V. and F.A. Willius. Disease of the Coronary Arteries Associated With Thrombo-Angiitis Obliterans of the Extremities. Ann Intern Med. 1929;3(1):35-39.
Pemberton, J.D. and F.A. Willius. Cardiac Features of Goitre. Annals of Surgery. 1932;95(4):508-516.
Thompson, L. and F.A. Willius. Actinobacillus Bacteremia. JAMA. 1932;99(4):298–300.
Smith, H.L. and F.A. Willius. Pericarditis: I. Chronic Adherent Pericarditis. Arch Intern Med (Chic). 1932;50(2):171–183. 
---. Pericarditis: II. Calcification of Pericardium. Arch Intern Med (Chic). 1932;50(2):184–191. 
---. Pericarditis: III. Pericarditis with Effusion. Arch Intern Med (Chic). 1932;50(2):192–202. 
---. Pericarditis: IV. Fibrinous Pericarditis and "Soldier's Patches". Arch Intern Med (Chic). 1932;50(3):410–414. 
---. Pericarditis: V. Terminal Pericarditis. Arch Intern Med (Chic). 1932;50(3):415–418.
---. Adiposity of the Heart: A Clinical and Pathologic Study of One Hundred and Thirty-six Obese Patients. Arch Intern Med (Chic). 1933;52(6):911–931. 
---. Further Observations on the Heart in Old Age. A Postmortem Study of 381 Patients Aged Seventy Years or More. American Heart Journal. 1932;8(2):170-181
---. Factors Concerned in Cardiac Hypertrophy: A Study Made at Necropsy of Seventy-nine Cases of Rheumatic Heart Disease. American Heart Journal. 1934;10(2):190-207.
Willius, F.A. and M.J. Anderson. Transient, Recurrent, Complete Bundle-branch Block: Report of a Case. American Heart Journal. 1934;10(2):248-252.
Goldsmith, G.A. and F.A. Willius. Bodily Build and Heredity in Coronary Thrombosis. Ann Intern Med. 1937;10(8):1181-1186
Willius, F.A. and T.J. Dry. Results From Trichlorethylene Inhalations in the Anginal Syndrome of Coronary Sclerosis. American Heart Journal. 1937;14(6):659-668.
Baker, T.W. and F.A. Willius. Coronary Thrombosis among Women. Am J M Sc. 1938; 196: 815-818
Ingham, D.W. and F.A. Willius. Congenital Transposition of the Great Arterial Trunks. American Heart Journal. 1938;15(4):482-489.
Boland, E.W. and F.A. Willius. Changes in the Liver Produced by Chronic Passive Congestion: With Special Reference to the Problem of Cardiac Cirrhosis. Arch Intern Med (Chic). 1938;62(5):723–739.
Goodson, W.H. and F.A. Willius. Coronary Thrombosis Among Persons Less Than Forty Years of Age; a Study of Thirty Cases. Minnesota Medicine, St. Paul. 1939;33:291-362.
Dry, T.J. and F.A. Willius. Calcareous Disease of the Aortic Valve: A Study of Two Hundred Twenty-Eight Cases. American Heart Journal. 1939;17(2):138-157.
---. Interpretation of the Electrocardiographic Findings in Calcareous Stenosis of the Aortic Valve. Ann Intern Med. 1939;13(1):143-150.
Brumm, H.J. and F.A. Willius. The Surgical Risk in Patients with Coronary Disease. JAMA. 1939;112(23):2377–2380. 
English, J.P. F.A. Willius, and J. Berkson. Tobacco and Coronary Disease. JAMA. 1940;115(16):1327–1329. 
Willius, F.A. and T.J. Dry. The Prognosis of Auricular Fibrillation of Undetermined Origin. JAMA. 1941;117(5):330–332.
Willius, F.A., T.J. Dry and R. Reeser. Life Expectancy in Conductive Disturbances Affecting the Ventricular Complex of the Electrocardiogram: General Considerations of Bundle Branch Block with Concordant and with Discordant Graphs and the Wide S-Wave Pattern, Based on 1,611 Cases. Arch Intern Med (Chic). 1941;67(5):1008–1026.
Reeser, R., F.A. Willius and T.J. Dry. Life Expectancy in Conductive Disturbances Affecting the Ventricular Complex of the Electrocardiogram: II. Special Consideration of Bundle Branch Block with Concordant Graphs and with Discordant Graphs. Arch Intern Med (Chic). 1941;67(5):1027–1033.
Dry, T.J., F.A. Willius and R. Reeser. Life Expectancy in Conductive Disturbances Affecting the Ventricular Complex of the Electrocardiogram: III. Special Consideration of the Wide S-Wave Pattern, with Report of Three Cases. Arch Intern Med (Chic). 1941;67(5):1034–1049.
Willius, F.A. and T.E. Keys. The Medical History of George Washington (1732-1799). Proceedings of the Staff Meetings of the Mayo Clinic. 1942;16(4)
---. The Medical History of Benjamin Franklin (1706-1790). Proceedings of the Staff Meetings of the Mayo Clinic. 1942;17(6)
English, J.P. and F.A. Willius. Hemorrhagic lesions of the Coronary Arteries. Arch Intern Med (Chic). 1943;71(5):594–601.
Parker, R.L., T.J. Dry, F.A. Willius and R.P. Gage. Life Expectancy in Angina Pectoris. JAMA. 1946;131(2):95–100.
Broadbent, W.H., F.A. Willius and T.E. Keys. Adhesive Pericarditis. CHEST Journal. 1969;55(4):331.

References

1888 births
1972 deaths
Historians from Minnesota
American cardiologists
American people of German descent
Physicians from Minnesota
Physicians of the Mayo Clinic
University of Minnesota alumni
University of Minnesota faculty
University of Minnesota Medical School alumni
American medical historians
People from Saint Paul, Minnesota
20th-century American historians